6521 may refer to:

6521 Pina, asteroid
6521 Project
The year in the 7th millennium